Mathilde Hylleberg (born 1 December 1998) is a former Danish female handball player, who last played for TTH Holstebro and the Danish national team.

She participated at the 2018 European Women's Handball Championship.

Achievements
Damehåndboldligaen:
Bronze Medalist: 2016
Danish Cup:
Bronze Medalist: 2019
Women's EHF Cup Winners' Cup: 
Winner: 2016

References

1998 births
Living people
Danish female handball players
People from Struer Municipality
TTH Holstebro players
Sportspeople from the Central Denmark Region
21st-century Danish women